Melachittakadu is a village in the Thanjavur taluk of Thanjavur district, Tamil Nadu, India.

Demographics 

As per the 2001 census, Melachittakadu had a total population of 546 with 275 males and 271 females. The sex ratio was 985. The literacy rate was 62.6.

References 

 

Villages in Thanjavur district